Sandra Studer (born 10 February 1969 in Zürich) is a Swiss moderator and singer who represented Switzerland in Eurovision Song Contest 1991, which was held in Rome, Italy. Performing with the stage name Sandra Simó, she came fifth with her song "Canzone per te" ("A song for you"), which she sang in Italian.

She is now a major Swiss television personality under her real name. Studer had previously appeared in the 1990 Swiss Eurovision heat with the song "Lo so" ("I know it") which was placed last. In recent years she has hosted the Swiss and German national selections for Eurovision and has also provided commentary of the contest for German-speaking audiences in Switzerland.

References

Eurovision Song Contest entrants for Switzerland
Eurovision Song Contest entrants of 1991
Musicians from Zürich
University of Zurich alumni
1969 births
Living people